The Niagara Fallsview Casino Resort (commonly known as Fallsview Casino) is a resort casino in Niagara Falls, Ontario, Canada. It opened publicly on June 10, 2004. The $1 billion complex overlooks the Horseshoe Falls and is one of the most prominent features of the Niagara skyline. The complex is owned by the Ontario Lottery and Gaming Corporation. As of June 2019, the casino's day-to-day operations are managed by Mohegan Gaming and Entertainment.

History
Planning began in February 1998 – Falls Management Group L.C. selected to develop new casino resort. The casino was built on a site that was once the transformer station building for the Ontario Power Company at the foot of Horseshoe Falls. Prior to the casino's construction, the site was also occupied by the Canadian Pacific Railway Montrose Subdivision. 

Construction began in 2001 and the resort opened on June 10, 2004.

In August 2022, the resort opened a new 5,000-seat concert hall, branded as the OLG Stage. The $130 million hall was originally scheduled to open in 2020, but its opening was cancelled due to the COVID-19 pandemic, and all other shows scheduled for it were either cancelled or moved to the existing Avalon Theatre until the venue cold be finalized.

Grounds

The casino resort complex takes up . The resort includes a  casino that holds over 130 gaming tables, including poker tables; and over 3,500 slot machines. Additionally, the resort includes 18 restaurant, a shopping centre with 30 shops, one nightclub, a  fitness spa, and a hotel with 372 rooms and suites. 

The resort includes two performance venues, the 1,500-seat Avalon Theatre, and the 5,000-seat OLG Stage.

The east façade of the complex retains the walls of the terrace and front entrance of the transformer station built in 1904. The area where the transformers resided is now the Grand Hall convention halls.

At the main entrance is a water feature called 'The Teslatron'. In its first few years of operation, it held night screenings with sound and lighting, but that has stopped in the last few years. At street level there is a fountain that varies its height with the wind so as not to wet pedestrians and passing cars. The resort also includes a parking lot with 3,000 spaces.

See also
 Casino Niagara
 List of casinos in Canada
 Seneca Niagara Casino & Hotel, the largest casino on the American side of the Falls
 List of tallest buildings in Niagara Falls, Ontario

References

External links

Niagara Fallsview Casino Resort
Fallsview Casino Restaurants
Digital Images Niagara Falls Public Library (Ont.)
Local Casinos in Canada - Fallsview Casino Resort

Culture of Niagara Falls, Ontario
Casinos in Ontario
Casinos completed in 2004
Hotel buildings completed in 2004
Buildings and structures in Niagara Falls, Ontario
Tourist attractions in Niagara Falls, Ontario
Music venues in Ontario